This list includes all developed, ported and published titles by Aspyr Media.

List of titles

References 

Aspyr
Aspyr games